German submarine U-347 was a Type VIIC U-boat of Nazi Germany's Kriegsmarine during World War II.

She was a member of three wolfpacks.

She was on her fourth patrol when she was sunk by a British aircraft on 17 July 1944.

She sank or damaged no ships.

Design
German Type VIIC submarines were preceded by the shorter Type VIIB submarines. U-347 had a displacement of  when at the surface and  while submerged. She had two shafts and two  propellers.

U-347 was fitted with five  torpedo tubes (four fitted at the bow and one at the stern), fourteen torpedoes, one  SK C/35 naval gun, 220 rounds, and two twin  C/30 anti-aircraft guns. The boat had a complement of between forty-four and sixty.

Service history
The submarine was laid down on 19 October 1942 at the Nordseewerke yard at Emden as yard number 219, launched on 21 May 1943 and commissioned on 7 July under the command of Oberleutnant zur See Johahn de Buhr.

U-347 served with the 8th U-boat Flotilla, for training and the 9th flotilla for operations from 1 March 1944. She was reassigned to the 11th flotilla on 1 June 1944.

First patrol
U-347 had sailed from Kiel in Germany to Stavanger in Norway March 1944, but her first patrol began when she departed Stavanger on 9 May. She arrived at Narvik on the 13th.

Second patrol
Her second foray began on 15 May 1944 when she departed Narvik (a port she would use as a base for the rest of her career), for the Norwegian Sea. She returned on 8 June.

Third patrol
U-347 departed Narvik on 23 June 1944; she returned the same day.

Fourth patrol and loss
The boat had departed Narvik on 3 July 1944. On the 17th, she was sunk by a B-24 Liberator of No. 86 Squadron RAF.

Forty-nine men died in the U-boat's sinking; there were no survivors.

Previously recorded fate
U-347 was thought to have been sunk on 17 July 1944 west of Narvik by a British PBY Catalina of No. 210 Squadron RAF. The pilot, Flying Officer John Cruickshank, was awarded the Victoria Cross for sinking .

Wolfpacks
U-347 took part in three wolfpacks, namely:
 Trutz (15 – 31 May 1944)
 Grimm (31 May – 6 June 1944)
 Trutz (5 – 10 July 1944)

References

Bibliography

External links

German Type VIIC submarines
U-boats commissioned in 1943
U-boats sunk in 1944
U-boats sunk by British aircraft
U-boats sunk by depth charges
World War II submarines of Germany
World War II shipwrecks in the Norwegian Sea
1943 ships
Ships built in Emden
Ships lost with all hands
Maritime incidents in July 1944